Scott Foster, nicknamed "The Extender" for extending playoff rounds,  (born April 8, 1967) is an American professional basketball referee for the National Basketball Association (NBA), wearing number 48. As of the 2021-22 NBA season  Foster has officiated 1,617 regular-season games, and 226 playoff games in 28 seasons.

Early life 
Foster was born on April 8, 1967, in Sliver Spring, Maryland. He went to high school at Magruder, and then went to the University of Maryland.

Officiating career 
Foster has officiated for 2 years at the Continental Basketball Association and college basketball, and 6 years at high school basketball. He has also officiated as, of the 2021-22 NBA season 1,617 regular-season games, and 226 playoff games in 28 seasons. One of his most notable games that he has officiated was the 2010 NBA Finals between the Los Angeles Lakers and the Boston Celtics, he officiated along with Danny Crawford and Joey Crawford.

Controversy 
He is disliked by Chris Paul who after a game 7 loss to the Rockets said, “that shit don’t make no sense...we could have won the game”. Paul Pierce also said about Foster, "He’s just not one you mess with. It shouldn’t be like that because when you look at it, it’s stars — Harden, DeRozan, Chris Paul that he’s getting into it with. You gotta be able to listen to the players, have that relationship." Several players have complained about Foster, one saying that, "You can’t talk to him. He’s never wrong" and, “I like refs where they say, ‘You know what, I made a mistake. I saw it at halftime. You were right.’ But Scott Foster thinks he never makes a mistake. The players see the stats of how he is on the road. He always helps the road team out. He loves to stick it to teams.” and a veteran player saying, “He had one of our playoff games and as soon as he walked in, I was like, ‘This game is over.’ We all knew we were going to get bad calls, and we did” and, “You couldn’t say anything to him. Hell, I don’t think you could even look at him.” Foster also averages calling 0.7 more personal fouls per game than the league average over his career.

In a survey, the LA Times interviewed 36 people to vote on who they thought were the best, and worst, referees. Foster received the most votes for worst referee, earning 24, which was nearly double the referee with the second most votes for the worst referee which was Lauren Holtkamp with 14 votes.

Statistics

Averages per game

Averages per game compared to league average

Home vs visitor 

All information comes from this source.

References

External links 

 National Basketball Referees Association bio

1967 births
Living people
People from Silver Spring, Maryland
National Basketball Association referees
University System of Maryland alumni